T. Gerald Hunter, more commonly known as Jerry Hunter, is an American graduate of the University of Cincinnati (BA), Aberystwyth (MPhil) and Harvard University (PhD). Originally from Cincinnati, he now lives in Wales and has held academic posts at Cardiff and more recently Bangor University, where he is currently (2015) a professor in the School of Welsh and deputy vice chancellor of the university He was a founding member of the pressure group Cymuned and is former editor of the Academi's literary periodical Taliesin.

His first monograph, Soffestri’r Saeson (University of Wales Press, 2000), a study of the use of prophecy as political propaganda in the Tudor age, was shortlisted for the Wales Book of the Year award in 2001. Llwch Cenhedloedd, (Gwasg Carreg Gwalch, 2003), which writes the history of the American Civil War based on Welsh-language evidence (mainly letters and other material written and published in Welsh on both sides of the Atlantic), won the Wales Book of the Year award in 2004. He has also published a book on the prominent Welsh American anti-slavery campaigner, Robert Everett: I Ddeffro Ysbryd y Wlad (Gwasg Carreg Gwalch, 2007), again drawing on a wealth of Welsh-language evidence mainly unused by historians. His interest in the Welsh-language history of his native United States has also led to the publication of an English-language volume Welsh Writing from the American Civil War: Sons of Arthur, Children of Lincoln (University of Wales Press, 2007).

He is also a fiction writer, having published a children's book, Ceffylau'r Cymylau (Gwasg Gomer, 2010), and four adult novels. His first, Gwenddydd (Gwasg Gwynedd, 2010), is a retelling in modern clothes of the medieval legend of Myrddin (Merlin) and his sister Gwenddydd, as recounted in the thirteenth-century poem "Cyfoesi Myrddin a Gwenddydd ei Chwaer", and won for him the Prose Medal at the National Eisteddfod of Wales.

Hunter is a member of Gorsedd Cymru, with the bardic name 'Gerallt Glan Ohio'.

References 

Living people
Year of birth missing (living people)
American emigrants to Wales
Bards of the Gorsedd
Welsh-speaking academics
Welsh-language writers
Welsh-language poets
Welsh language activists
University of Cincinnati alumni
Harvard University alumni
Academics of Bangor University
American expatriate academics
Educators from Cincinnati